HD 72922, also known as HR 3393, is a suspected astrometric binary located in the southern circumpolar constellation Chamaeleon. A  1993 paper by Olin J. Eggen lists it as a member of the Milky Way's old disk population.

It has an apparent magnitude of 5.67, making it faintly visible to the naked eye under ideal conditions. Based on parallax measurements from the Gaia satellite, the system is estimated to be 274 light years away from the Solar System. At its current distance, HD 72922's brightness is diminished by magnitudes due to interstellar dust. It has an absolute magnitude of +1.27.

The visible component is an evolved red giant with a stellar classification of G8 III. It is currently on the horizontal branch, fusing helium at its core. It radiates 41.2 times the luminosity of the Sun from its photosphere at an effective temperature of 4,708 K, giving it a yellowish hue. HD 72922 is metal poor with a metallicity only 37% that of the Sun; it spins too slowly to be measured.

References

Chamaeleon (constellation)
G-type giants
072922
CD-80 290
041191
3393
Chamaeleontis, 6